Sabiana Anestor (born 31 March 1994) is a Haitian judoka. She competed in the women's half lightweight event at the 2020 Summer Olympics. She served the flag bearer with Darrelle Valsaint at the opening ceremony.

References

External links
 

1994 births
Living people
Haitian female judoka
Olympic judoka of Haiti
Judoka at the 2020 Summer Olympics
20th-century Haitian women
21st-century Haitian women